The 2017–18 New Orleans Privateers men's basketball team represented the University of New Orleans during the 2017–18 NCAA Division I men's basketball season. The Privateers were led by seventh-year head coach Mark Slessinger and played their home games at Lakefront Arena as members of the Southland Conference. They finished the season 16–17, 11–7 in Southland play to finish in a tie for fifth place. As the No. 5 seed in the Southland tournament, they defeated Texas A&M–Corpus Christi in the first round before losing to Sam Houston State in the quarterfinals. They received an invitation to the College Basketball Invitational where they defeated Texas–Rio Grande Valley in the first round and received a second round bye before losing in the quarterfinals to Campbell.

Previous season 
The Privateers finished the 2016–17 season 20–12, 13–5 in Southland play to win the regular season Southland championship. They defeated Sam Houston State and Texas A&M–Corpus Christi to win the Southland Conference tournament. As a result, they earned the conference's automatic bid to the NCAA tournament where they lost in the First Four to Mount St. Mary's.

Roster

Schedule and results

|-
!colspan=9 style=|Exhibition

|-
!colspan=9 style=|Non-conference regular season

|-
!colspan=9 style=|Southland regular season

|-
!colspan=9 style=| Southland tournament

|-
!colspan=9 style=|CBI

Source

See also
2017–18 New Orleans Privateers women's basketball team

References

New Orleans Privateers men's basketball seasons
New Orleans
New Orleans
New Orleans Privateers men's basketball
New Orleans Privateers men's basketball